Pablo Rindt (born 3 December 1990), better known by his stage name Maddix, is a Dutch DJ and record producer originating from Eindhoven. His songs are regularly played at the largest EDM festivals in the genre of Big Room and Progressive House. He is signed to Revealed Recordings, and has collaborated with the label's founder Hardwell. 

He studied at the Utrecht University of the Arts in 2013, and started putting materials that caught the attention of DJ stars such as Afrojack and Dimitri Vegas & Like Mike and particularly Hardwell. He released "Raise Em Up" on Spinnin' Records followed by remixes for Calvin Harris, Dannic and Sick Individuals. His big breakthrough came in 2015 with "Riptide" that was performed by Ummet Ozcan and became part of Hardwell presents Revealed Vol. 6. This started a closer collaboration with Revealed Recordings with more songs like "Ghosts", "Voltage", "Dirty Bassline" and "Invictus" under this label. His first direct collaboration with Hardwell came in "Smash This Beat", which appeared in July 2017 at the Hardwell & Friends EP #1. The solo single "Trabanca" credited to Maddix & Junior built further on his success making it #1 on the Beatport charts. Other collaborations with Hardwell include "Conquerors" and "Bella Ciao". He also produced the 2018 psytrance single "Mangalam" with Will Sparks. Maddix also regularly performs at major music festivals.

Discography

Singles 
2013: "Touching The Sky"
2013: "Splash"
2014: "Rampant"
2014: "Send Us Some Bottles"
2014: "Anthems" (with New Knife Gang)
2014: "Solar Flare"
2014: "Gravity"
2014: "Get Busy" (with Dirty Herz)
2015: "Raise Em Up"
2015: "True Blood"
2015: "Riptide"
2015: "Vortex"
2015: "Ghosts"
2016: "Pulsar"
2016: "Lynx" (with Futuristic Polar Bears)
2016: "Tumalon"
2016: "Jackal"
2016: "Voltage" (with Jayden Jaxx)
2016: "Dirty Bassline"
2016: "Zodiac"
2016: "Invictus" (with Olly James)
2016: "Unstoppable" (with Tony Junior)
2016: "Game On"
2016: "Shake It" (with Joey Dale)
2017: "Trippin"
2017: "BANG" (with Kevu)
2017: "Fauda" (with Rivero)
2017: "B.A.S.E" (with Kill The Buzz)
2017: "Smash This Beat" (with Hardwell)
2017: "Showdown" (with LoaX)
2017: "Badman" (with Futuristic Polar Bears)
2017: "The Underground"
2017: "Trabanca" (with Junior)
2017: "Mantra"
2018: "Lose Control"
2018: "Soldier" (with Kevu featuring LePrince)
2018: "Keep It Jackin"
2018: "Bella Ciao" (with Hardwell)
2018: "The Prophecy" (with Timmy Trumpet)
2018: "Shuttin It Down" (featuring Kris Kiss)
2018: "Mangalam" (with Will Sparks)
2019: "Zero"
2019: "The Omen"
2019: "Invincible (Till The Day We Die)" (featuring Michael Jo)
2019: "With Or Without You"
2019: "People Are Strange" (with KAAZE featuring Nino Lucarelli)
2020: "Follow Me" (with SaberZ)
2020: "Bad Meets Evil" (featuring Anvy)
2020: "Ecstasy"
2020: "Technology"
2020: "Existence"
2020: "Electric"
2020: "Tekno"
2020: "Reality"
2021: "Activating"
2021: "Superheroes"
2021: "In My Body"
2021: "Home"
2021: "Receive Live"
2021: "Acid Soul"
2021: "Space In Your Mind" (with The Rocketman)
2021: "PYDNA"
2021: "Different State"
2021: "State Of Mind"
2022: "The Formula"
2022: "Culture"
2022: "Purpose" (with Blasterjaxx)
2022: "Heute Nacht" 
2022: "Thrill" (with Gregor Potter & Linka)

Remixes

2013: Ana Criado & Beatservice – Whispers (Maddix Remix)
2013: Pestroy – Pay For Your Saviour (Maddix Club Remix)
2014: Calvin Harris ft. Ellie Goulding – Outside (Maddix Remix)
2014: Dannic ft. Bright Lights – Dear Life (Maddix Remix)
2015: Sick Individuals – Lost & Found (Maddix Remix)
2016: Shane 54 feat. Jenny Jordan – Paradise (Maddix Remix)
2017: Sick Individuals – Alive (Maddix Remix)
2019: "Invincible (Till The Day We Die)" (featuring Michael Jo) (Festival Mix)
2019: "People Are Strange" (with KAAZE featuring Nino Lucarelli) (Festival Mix)
2020: Armin Van Buuren feat. Trevor Guthrie – This Is What It Feels Like (Maddix Remix)
2021: "Superheroes" (Tribe Edit)"
2021: "Hardwell feat. Amba Shepherd – Apollo (Maddix Remix)
2021: "Squid Game – Pink Soldiers (Maddix Remix)"
2022: "Marcel Woods - Advanced (Maddix Remix)"
2022: Tiësto - Lethal Industry (Maddix Remix)

References

External links
 

Dutch DJs
Dutch record producers
1990 births
Living people